Josephine Trigg Pigott House is a historic home located at Boonville, Cooper County, Missouri. It was built between 1857 and 1860, and is a -story, "T"-plan, Gothic Revival style brick dwelling.  It has flared gable roofs distinguished by returns and a centered cross gable. It was built by Dr. William H. Trigg as a wedding gift for his daughter, as was the Juliet Trigg Johnson House.

It was listed on the National Register of Historic Places in 1990.

References

Houses on the National Register of Historic Places in Missouri
Gothic Revival architecture in Missouri
Houses completed in 1857
Houses in Cooper County, Missouri
National Register of Historic Places in Cooper County, Missouri
1860 establishments in Missouri
Boonville, Missouri